Kong Zhaoshou (1876–1929),  a direct male-line 71st generation descendant of Confucius, was a Chinese educator who twice served as President of Hunan First Normal University from April 1913 to January 1914, and September 1916 to September 1918. His students included Mao Zedong, Cai Hesen, Xiao Zisheng, Xiao San, He Shuheng, Li Weihan, and Li Lisan.

Names
His style name was Mingquan,  and his art name was Jingcheng and Jingju, his pen name was Rangyi.

Biography

Kong was born and raised in Dahu Town of Liuyang, Hunan. He graduated from Hunan Youji Normal College in 1910. In April 1913, he served as President of Hunan First Normal University, he persecuted by Yuan Shikai for his criticism of Empire of China (1915–1916). In January 1914, Tang Xiangming, a naval officer supporter of Yuan Shikai, sent his soldiers to arrest Kong, but he escaped to Japan and studied at Hosei University. In 1916, after the death of Yuan Shikai, Tan Yankai succeeded Tang Xiangming to become Governor of Hunan, he invited Kong to serve as President of Hunan First Normal University. In November 1917, Fu Liangzuo, a naval officer supporter of Duan Qirui, with his army attacked Changsha, but soon they were run off the land by Kong and his students. In 1922, Kong became Vice Parliamentary Leader of Hunan Provincial Council. He died of illness at Kangji Hospital of Nanjing in 1929.

Personal life
Kong and his wife (her surname was Tang ) had two sons and two daughters.

 Son: Kong Bolin
 Son: Kong Quanlin.

References

1876 births
1929 deaths
People from Liuyang
Hosei University alumni
Presidents of Hunan First Normal University
Educators from Hunan
Republic of China politicians from Hunan
Politicians from Changsha